The 1974 Humboldt State Lumberjacks football team represented Humboldt State University during the 1974 NCAA Division II football season. Humboldt State competed in the Far Western Conference (FWC).

The 1974 Lumberjacks were led by ninth-year head coach Bud Van Deren. They played home games at the Redwood Bowl in Arcata, California. Humboldt State finished with a record of four wins and six losses (4–6, 2–3 FWC). The Lumberjacks outscored their opponents 201–200 for the season.

Schedule

Notes

References

Humboldt State
Humboldt State Lumberjacks football seasons
Humboldt State Lumberjacks football